The Antwerpsche Diamantkring was established in 1928 in Antwerp, Belgium, to become the first diamond bourse worldwide that is dedicated exclusively to rough diamonds trade.

It is a member of the World Federation of Diamond Bourses.

85% of the world’s diamond supply is traded in Antwerp, and in particular in the Antwerpsche Diamantkring.

Presidents of the Board of Directors
 1929-1957 Gustave Garitte
 1957-1961 Frans Beukelaar
 1961-1972 Israel Beck
 1973-1979 Michel Fraenkel
 1979-1987 Sammy Hutterer
 1987-1999 Isi Beck
 1999-2003 Gerson Goldschmidt
 2003-2012 David Wahl
 2012- Alfred (Freddy) Inzlicht

Rough Diamond Day
The Rough Diamond Day is a biannual international event dedicated to rough diamonds trade, organized by the Antwerpsche Diamantkring.

External links

References

Business organisations based in Belgium
Companies based in Antwerp
Diamond exchanges
Financial services companies established in 1928
Belgian companies established in 1928